Wood Boulden, also known as Wood Bouldin, (January 20, 1811 – October 10, 1876) was a Virginia lawyer, plantation owner and politician.  He served as a justice of the Supreme Court of Virginia from 1872 to 1876.

Early and family life
Born in Charlotte County, Virginia to the former Ann Lewis and her husband, Congressman Thomas Bouldin(1781-1834), he was named for his grandfather Wood Bouldin, who had married Joanna, the aunt of U.S. President John Tyler. Thus among the First Families of Virginia even in his early youth, Bouldin was sent to Richmond to receive a private education from Mr. Turner. He then was sent to  Bedford County, Virginia to attend the New London Academy conducted by Rev. Nicholas H. Cobbs, later the bishop of Alabama. After teaching school for a year, Bouldin moved to Halifax County, Virginia and studied law under William Leigh.

He married Maria Louisa Barksdale on December 22, 1837 in Charlotte County, and they had a son, Wood Bouldin (1838-1911). After her death he married Martha Baldwin Daniel (1819-), sister of judge William Daniel of Lynchburg, who would bear daughters Elvina, Martha, Ann, Alice and Virginia, as well as sons Charles Ellett, Briscoe Baldwin and Frank Deane Bouldin.

Career
After admission to the Virginia Bar, Bouldin moved to Charlotte Courthouse to begin practice, but discovered the estate of his father was greatly embarrassed. In 1840, his household of four white males (including his brothers William and Thomas and one boy) also included 13 slaves. Seeking a larger practice, Bouldin moved to Richmond in 1842 and entered a law partnership with Robert Stanard, who soon became a Judge of the Court of Appeals.

In 1853 Bouldin purchased a plantation on Staunton River formerly owned by John Randolph of Roanoke as well as practiced law in Charlotte, Halifax and Mecklenburg Counties. By 1860, Bouldin owned more than 69 enslaved people in Charlotte County.

American Civil War

Elected to the Virginia Secession Convention of 1861, Boulden favored secession on the second vote, which resolution passed. His son Wood Bouldin, a recent University of Virginia graduate, would suspend their legal partnership in order to become a Confederate artillery lieutenant with the Staunton Hill artillery throughout the war.

During the Civil War, Charlotte County voters elected Boulden to the Virginia House of Delegates, and he served in that part-time position throughout the war.

Pardoned by U.S. President Andrew Johnson, Bouldin failed to win election to the Virginia Constitutional Convention of 1868, losing to freed slave Joseph R. Holmes. Bouldin was present to hear the decision of the Virginia Supreme Court concerning the contested Richmond, Virginia mayoral election of 1870 when the overcrowded balcony collapsed and killed several men and injured many more. Severely shocked but sustaining no serious injury, Bouldin took a short rest.

In 1872, Virginia legislators elected Bouldin to fill a vacant seat on the Court of Appeals but his judicial career was relatively short as he died on October 10, 1876.

Death and legacy

Bouldin died on his plantation and was buried there.  His son of the same name (1838-1911) became active in the state Democratic party and was elected and re-elected Commonwealth's attorney for Halifax County. He would represent it at the Virginia Constitutional Convention of 1902, and play a key role in disenfranchising African Americans.

References

Justices of the Supreme Court of Virginia
Virginia lawyers
1811 births
1876 deaths
People from Charlotte County, Virginia
Members of the Virginia House of Delegates
19th-century American lawyers
19th-century American judges
19th-century American politicians